Ján Kozák (born 17 April 1954) is a Slovak football manager and former player. Most recently, he managed Slovak national team. As the manager of Slovakia, his team qualified for the 2016 UEFA Euro, thus becoming Slovakia's first time to appear in the tournament.

In 1981, Kozák became footballer of the year in Czechoslovakia. He played 254 matches in Czechoslovak First League and scored 57 goals. He also participated in UEFA Euro 1980 and the 1982 FIFA World Cup. His son Ján Kozák is also a former footballer, coach and one of the pioneers of footgolf in Slovakia.

Personal
Kozák's son, Ján Kozák, is also former national player of Slovakia and currently head coach of Slovan Bratislava; his grandson, Filip Lesniak, is also footballer and plays for Danish club Silkeborg IF.

Honours

Player
Dukla Prague
Czechoslovak First League: Winners: 1981–82
Czechoslovak Cup: Winners: 1981

Lokomotíva Košice
Czechoslovak Cup: Winners (2x): 1977, 1979

Czechoslovakia
UEFA Euro 1980: 3rd place
1982 FIFA World Cup: Group stage

Individual
Czechoslovak Footballer of the Year: 1981

Manager
1.FC Košice
MARS Superliga: Winners (2x) 1996–97 1997–98
UEFA Champions League: Group Stage 1997–98

MFK Košice
DOXXbet liga: Winners: 2005–06 (Promoted)
Slovak Cup: Winners: 2009

Slovakia
UEFA Euro 2016: Round of 16

Individual
Slovak Manager of the Year: Winner (5): 2013, 2014, 2015, 2016, 2017

Managerial statistics

Jan Kozak resigned after a loss against the Czech Republic in Trnava (Slovakia). He blamed 7 players in his squad, for his decision to resign.

References
 
 Weltfussball.de profile 

1954 births
Living people
Association football midfielders
Slovak footballers
Czechoslovak footballers
Czechoslovakia international footballers
UEFA Euro 1980 players
1982 FIFA World Cup players
Dukla Prague footballers
R.F.C. Seraing (1904) players
FC Lokomotíva Košice players
Bourges 18 players
Slovak football managers
FC Lokomotíva Košice managers
MFK Zemplín Michalovce managers
FC VSS Košice managers
Slovak Super Liga managers
Slovakia national football team managers
Expatriate footballers in Belgium
Expatriate footballers in France
Czechoslovak expatriate footballers
Czechoslovak expatriate sportspeople in Belgium
Czechoslovak expatriate sportspeople in France
UEFA Euro 2016 managers
People from Spišská Nová Ves District
Sportspeople from the Košice Region